Ratsua is an Austronesian language of Bougainville, Papua New Guinea.

References

Northwest Solomonic languages
Languages of Papua New Guinea
Languages of the Autonomous Region of Bougainville